Nojima (written: 野島 or 野嶋) is a Japanese surname. Notable people with the surname include:

, Japanese voice actor
, Japanese voice actor
, Japanese video game writer
, Japanese voice actor
, Japanese baseball player
, Japanese classical pianist
, Japanese footballer
, Japanese dermatologist
, Japanese photographer

See also
Nojima Fault, a seismic fault

Japanese-language surnames